The city of Turku, in Finland, is divided into nine wards ( in Finnish,  in Swedish), which are further divided into 78 districts (see Districts of Turku). The ward division does not always follow district boundaries.

The wards are identified by numbers from one to nine, as well as by a semi-official name.

Wards
City Centre (Keskusta/Centrum)
Hirvensalo-Kakskerta
Uittamo-Skanssi (Uittamo-Skansen)
Itäharju-Varissuo (Österås-Kråkkärret)
Koroinen (Korois)
Tampereentie (Tammerforsvägen)
Kuninkoja
Naantalintie (Nådendalsvägen)
Maaria-Paattinen (S:t Marie-Patis)

See also
Districts of Turku

 
Turku